The Alonzo J. and Flora Barkley House is a historic building located in Boone, Iowa, United States.  Alonzo Barkley was a local banker who was involved in real estate and local politics.  His first wife, Henrietta Trickey, died in 1889.  He married Flora Spencer two years later. He had this house built in 1893. It is a two-story frame Queen Anne with Shingle style influences. The Shingle style, along with the Eastlake and Stick styles, were rare in central Iowa.  Typical of the Queen Anne style, the house features an asymmetrical plan with steeply pitched irregular roof forms.  The upper two-thirds of the house is covered in shingles.  It was listed on the National Register of Historic Places in 1995.

References

Houses completed in 1893
Queen Anne architecture in Iowa
Boone, Iowa
Houses on the National Register of Historic Places in Iowa
National Register of Historic Places in Boone County, Iowa
Houses in Boone County, Iowa